The yellow-breasted tit (Cyanistes cyanus flavipectus) is a bird in the family Paridae. It is found in Afghanistan, China, Kazakhstan, Kyrgyzstan, India, Pakistan, Russia, Tajikistan, Turkmenistan, and Uzbekistan. Its natural habitat is temperate forests.

It is usually classified as a subspecies of the azure tit.

References

yellow-breasted tit
Birds of Afghanistan
Birds of Central Asia
Birds of Pakistan
yellow-breasted tit
yellow-breasted tit
Taxonomy articles created by Polbot